Taipei Arena is a metro station in Taipei, Taiwan served by Taipei Metro. The station opened on 15 November 2014.

Station overview
This three-level, underground station has an island platform. It is located beneath Nanjing East Rd. to the west of Beining Rd. It opened in November 2014 with the opening of the Songshan Line.

Originally, the station was to be named "Taipei Stadium Station". However, the area was renamed to "Taipei City Sports Park", no longer using the original station name. Thus, on 22 July 2011, the Department of Rapid Transit Systems announced that the station would be renamed to Taipei Arena station, using Taipei Arena to signify the park.

Construction
It has five exits, two vent shafts, and two accessibility elevators.

Public Art
The theme for this station is "Energy, Movement, Light, Tracks". The design aims to reflect the station's liveliness, spirit, and power. It has public art designs.

Station layout

Around the station
 Taipei Arena
 Land Reform Museum

References

Railway stations opened in 2014
Songshan–Xindian line stations
2014 establishments in Taiwan